Signature Half-Step a Retrospective 2000-2014 is a 2014 compilation of songs recorded by Rock artist Spencer Albee. The album features material spanning his first Popsicko solo album in 2000 to the 2013 Spencer, in addition to the new single "Why Am I a Fool."

Track listing
"Why Am I a Fool"
"I'm Breathing" taken from the album The Popsicko Vol. 1
"Two Feet" taken from the album The Popsicko Vol. 1
"Bad Math" taken from the album I Love You! Good Morning!
"Something Fierce" taken from the album Something Fierce
"This Is Real" taken from the album Open Letter to the Damned
"Gretchen My Captain" taken from the album Open Letter to the Damned
"Technicolor Love" taken from the album Open Letter to the Damned
"Open Letter to the Damned" taken from the album Open Letter to the Damned
"So Good" taken from the album Greetings From Area Code 207, Vol. 6
"Destroy the Plastique Man" taken from the album Destroy the Plastique Man
"Dancing a Murderous Tango" taken from the album Destroy the Plastique Man
"Big Old House" taken from the album Candy, Cake, & Ice Cream
"Where You Been" taken from the album Candy, Cake, & Ice Cream
"Whatever Gary" taken from the album Candy, Cake, & Ice Cream
"Tea and Cocaine" taken from the album Space Versus Speed
"I Rok" taken from the album Space Versus Speed
"Mackworth" taken from the album Spencer
"California's Calling" taken from the album Spencer
"Wait Through the War" taken from the album Spencer

References

2014 compilation albums
Spencer Albee albums